Contra Las Cuerdas is an Argentine sports-orientated telenovela. It was recorded during 2010. The show stars Rodrigo de la Serna, Soledad Fandiño and Osmar Núñez.

Plot
Contra Las Cuerdas is about a boxer named Ezequiel who travels from the Argentine interior to Buenos Aires in order to find his brother Luciano. Once Ezequiel arrives in Buenos Aires, the brothers meet a woman named Ana, which will lead them to romance and trouble.

Production
Contra Las Cuerdas was produced by ON TV Llorente together with Villaruel Contenidos for Telefe.

International versions
Contra el Destino is a Colombian adaptation of Contra Las Cuerdas. It was produced by RCN TV channel. It tells the story of a boxer who goes to Bogota to hide after refusing to lose a fight for the mob.

External links

2010 Argentine television series debuts
Argentine television shows
Argentine telenovelas
Televisión Pública original programming
Spanish-language telenovelas